Jamal "Gravy" Woolard (born July 8, 1975) is an American actor and rapper. He is best known for portraying rapper The Notorious B.I.G. in the film Notorious, and, as a supporting character, in the Tupac Shakur biopic All Eyez on Me.

Life and career
Woolard is from Bensonhurst Brooklyn and Lafayette Gardens, Brooklyn. In real life he raps under the name "Gravy". He is featured in the song "Untouchable" by Tupac Shakur on the Pac's Life album. He had to add over 50 pounds to his frame to play The Notorious B.I.G. in the film Notorious.

Woolard was previously known for being shot near radio station Hot 97 in 2006 and giving an interview on the Funkmaster Flex show directly afterwards. His music was later banned from play at the station as a result of a policy that bans "music by any artist who is involved in an altercation at the station."

In 2016, he starred in the movie Barbershop: The Next Cut as Marquese. Woolard reprised his role as The Notorious B.I.G. in All Eyez on Me, a biopic about Tupac Shakur, which was released in June 2017.

Mixtapes
Hell Up In Harlem (Hosted by DJ Kay Slay) (2005)
Who Shot Mayor Goonberg? Polotics As Usual Vol.1 (2006)
Mayor Goonberg Visits Africa (2006)
The Come Up Mixtape (2006)
THE COME UP Mixtape: In Da Trap (2006)
N.Y. Target (2007)
Brooklyn Capo (The Come Up Rockstar ED 4) (2007)
Guess Who's Back (The Official Best Of Gravy) (2007)
Notorious Classics (2008)
Gravy: Without A Doubt (2008)
Notorious Gravy (2009)
Don't Think Its All Gravy [feat. DJ O.P. & Dirty Money] (2015)

Awards and nominations
 BET Awards
 2009: Best Actor, Nominated
 Black Reel Awards
 2010: Best Breakthrough Performance (Notorious), Nominated
 2010: Best Ensemble (Notorious), Nominated

References

External links
 

1975 births
American stand-up comedians
American shooting survivors
Living people
Male actors from New York City
Rappers from Brooklyn
Comedians from New York City
21st-century American rappers
21st-century American comedians